The Road to Infinity is a collection of seventeen scientific essays by American writer and scientist Isaac Asimov. It was the fourteenth of a series of books collecting Asimov's science essays from The Magazine of Fantasy and Science Fiction. It also included a list of all of Asimov's essays in that magazine up to 1979. It was first published by Doubleday & Company in 1979.

Contents

"The Subtlest Difference" (F&SF, October 1977)
"The Sons of Mars Revisited" (November 1977)
"Dark and Bright" (December 1977)
"The Real Finds Waiting" (January 1978)
"The Lost Art" (February 1978)
"Anyone For Tens?" (March 1978)
"The Floating Crystal Palace" (April 1978)
"By Land and By Sea" (May 1978)
"We Were the First that Ever Burst" (June 1978)
"Second to the Skua" (July 1978)
"Rings and Things" (August 1978)
"Countdown" (September 1978)
"Toward Zero" (October 1978)
"Fifty Million Big Brothers" (November 1978)
"Where is Everybody?" (December 1978)
"Proxima" (January 1979)
"The Road to Infinity" (February 1979)

External links
Asimovonline.com
The Road to Infinity at Asimovreviews.com
The Road to Infinity at Goodreads.com

Essay collections by Isaac Asimov
1978 books
Works originally published in The Magazine of Fantasy & Science Fiction
Doubleday (publisher) books